Deposition or Lamentation over the Dead Christ is a painting by Giovanni Bellini and his workshop, dating to 1515–16 and thus one of his last works. It measures 4.44 m by 3.12 m and is in oils on canvas. It was commissioned for the Santa Maria dei Servi church in Venice, which is now demolished; it is now in the Gallerie dell'Accademia in that city.

References 

1516 paintings
Paintings by Giovanni Bellini
Paintings in the Gallerie dell'Accademia